Lily C.A.T. is a 1987 science fiction/horror anime film written and directed by Hisayuki Toriumi, featuring monster designs from Yoshitaka Amano and character designs from Yasuomi Umetsu. An English version of the film was produced by Carl Macek and distributed by Streamline Pictures. After the closing of Streamline Pictures, the distribution rights were obtained by Discotek Media. The film is heavily inspired by Ridley Scott's Alien and by John Carpenter's The Thing.

Plot 
In the 23rd century, companies are now surveying distant planets for mining rights. The Syncam Corporation is investigating a relatively new planet and has hired deep-space cruiser Saldes to shuttle company surveyors to investigate. The employees consist of Jiro Takagi of the Japanese division, Dick Berry of the Australian division, the president's daughter Nancy, Farrah Van Dorothy, Morgan W. Scott, Jimmy, and Dr. Harris Mead, while the crew consists of Captain Mike Hamilton, his subordinates Dular, Walt, and Carolyn, and mechanics Guy and Watts. In addition, Nancy has brought her cat, Lily, on board. The ship allows its passengers to go into hypersleep for 20 years and only biologically age one month.

During the voyage, the ship's computer detects debris flying through space and collects a sample, which causes the extraterrestrial matter to become loose in the ship while the crew and the surveyors are in cryogenic sleep. Upon awakening, the crew learns that two of the surveyors are impostors, but a bigger problem emerges when Morgan is found dead from a mysterious infection. Dr. Mead, Lily, Guy, and Watts also perish from what appears to be a bacterial infection, which dissolves the bodies of its victims, but leaves their clothes intact. During this, Berry attempts to discover who the impostors are by checking their backgrounds.

The bacteria quickly evolves into a hostile life-form capable of mimicking the form of its human victims and kills Dorothy in the sickbay. The computer controls are also overrun by an unknown entity, which results in the deaths of Dular and Walt. Back in sickbay, Jiro and Berry are revealed to be the impostors when Jiro gives an explanation for the bacteria; Jiro is a medical student who murdered three drug dealers who he held responsible for his sister's death from an overdose and Berry is a detective determined to bring him in. Berry handcuffs Jiro, though Hamilton warns Berry that because decades have passed since the murders, no one else is interested in Jiro being brought to justice.

The survivors soon confront the bacteria, which results in Berry getting injured from the recoil of his shotgun. Hamilton and Jimmy create flamethrowers to deal with the bacteria, though Jimmy and Carolyn are quickly killed. Hamilton manages to survive and discovers that a robotic replica of Nancy's cat known as "The Master" or Lily-C.A.T., a Computerized Animal-shaped Technological robot, is responsible for taking over the ship. He then realizes that Syncam wanted to study the bacteria with no concern for the lives of the human crew. Meanwhile, Berry holds a grudge against Jiro because the murders prevented the police from shutting down the dealer's drug ring and cost him a promotion.

Hamilton, Jiro, Nancy, and Berry flee to the main bridge, where Berry dies from the infection. In a fit of defeatism, Jiro attempts suicide, until Hamilton reveals a shuttle he stored. Hamilton proceeds to destroy the ship by letting out the hydrogen and setting off a lighter, while Jiro and Nancy escape to the planet below them; the remaining bacteria burns up in the atmosphere.

Cast

References

External links
 
 

1987 anime OVAs
1987 films
1987 horror films
1980s science fiction horror films
Anime with original screenplays
Direct-to-video horror films
Direct-to-video science fiction films
Discotek Media
Films set in the 23rd century
Horror anime and manga
Japanese animated horror films
Japanese animated science fiction films
Pierrot (company)
Single OVAs